East Tilbury railway station is on a loop line of the London, Tilbury and Southend line, serving the village of East Tilbury, Essex. Its three-letter station code is ETL.

It was opened on 7 September 1936 as a halt station intended to serve workers at the nearby Bata Shoe Company, which paid for the construction of the platforms. Initially, trains only stopped in rush hour. The halt was upgraded to full station status in January 1949. Increasing patronage at East Tilbury led to the closure in 1967 of Low Street, a minor station close by.

The station and all trains serving it are operated by c2c.

It is located close to Coalhouse Fort, an artillery fort dating from the 1860s.

Services 

The typical off-peak service consists of:
2 trains per hour (tph) to London Fenchurch Street via ;
2 tph to Southend Central.

External links 

Transport in Thurrock
Railway stations in Essex
DfT Category E stations
Former London, Midland and Scottish Railway stations
Railway stations in Great Britain opened in 1936
Railway stations served by c2c
1936 establishments in England